The Superior Building, originally known as the Cleveland Discount Building, is a high-rise building in Cleveland, Ohio. The building rises  in Downtown Cleveland. It contains 22 floors, and was completed in 1922. The Superior Building currently stands as the 28th-tallest building in the city. The architectural firm who designed the building was Walker & Weeks. The building's design incorporates a set of Doric columns in its base.

The Superior Building was one of the earliest skyscrapers to be completed in Cleveland. However, it never stood as the tallest structure in the city; the Keith Building, also completed in 1922, rose only  taller, and thus captured the title of tallest building in Cleveland. The Superior Building was added to the National Register of Historic Places in 1991.

See also
 List of tallest buildings in Cleveland
 Society for Savings Building

References

External links

Office buildings completed in 1922
Skyscraper office buildings in Cleveland
Commercial buildings on the National Register of Historic Places in Ohio
National Register of Historic Places in Cleveland, Ohio
Neoclassical architecture in Cleveland